Andrew James Ginther (born April 27, 1975) is an American Democratic politician, the 53rd mayor of Columbus, Ohio, and the 48th person to serve in that office.  He served as President of Columbus City Council from 2011 until 2015.

Early life and education
Ginther was born at Riverside Hospital in Columbus, the third of four children.  Ginther's mother was a social worker and his father was an attorney specializing in adoption and foster law.  His family lived in the Clintonville neighborhood of Columbus.

After graduation from Whetstone High School, Ginther attended Earlham College in Richmond, Indiana, where he earned a BA in Political Science in 1997.  As part of Earlham's foreign study program, Ginther traveled to Northern Ireland to study peace and conflict resolution at the University of Ulster and Queen's College.  He also taught at public schools in Belfast and Derry.  Ginther served internships at the Carter Center in Atlanta, where he taught nonviolence and dispute resolution to children.

Career
Ginther served as a legislative aide to Ohio state Senator Dan Brady.  He then served as coordinator of violence prevention programs for the local nonprofit organization Strategies Against Violence Everywhere (SAVE).

20012007: Columbus Board of Education

In 1999, Ginther ran unsuccessfully for a seat on the Columbus Board of Education. He worked as the chief fundraiser during her unsuccessful run for Congress. In 2001 his second campaign was successful, and he served as a member of the school board for six years, being reelected in 2005. Ginther also worked for 10 years as community outreach coordinator for Triumph Communications, a central Ohio company providing public relations and political campaign management services.

20072015: Columbus City Council
In February 2007, Ginther was appointed to the Columbus City Council to fill an unexpired term after the resignation of Matt Habash.  He was elected to a new term as a member of City Council in November 2007, was reelected as a member in 2009, and on January 3, 2011 was selected to replace Michael C. Mentel as Council president, becoming the youngest City Council president in the history of Columbus at age 35.  In 2011 Ginther accepted a new position as vice president of Community Affairs and Outreach for nonprofit Children's Hunger Alliance.  He remained City Council president through the end of 2015.

2016present: Mayor of Columbus
In March 2015, Ginther and fellow Democrat Zach Scott, the former Franklin County, Ohio Sheriff, were selected in a primary election by Columbus voters to compete in the November 2015 general election to replace retiring Columbus Mayor Michael B. Coleman (D).  In the general election on November 3, 2015, Ginther defeated Scott with 59% of the vote.

In 2019, Ginther was reelected unopposed as mayor of Columbus. During his State of the City address in February 2020, he announced initiatives to improve the city's Sullivant Avenue corridor in Franklinton and the Hilltop.

Ginther is running for a third term in the 2023 Columbus, Ohio mayoral election.

Administration and cabinet

Personal life
Mayor Ginther and his family live in The Knolls, a subdivision in the northwest side of Columbus. The family moved there in August 2019.

See also
Columbus, Ohio mayoral election, 2015
 List of mayors of the 50 largest cities in the United States

References

External links

 Mayor's Office, City of Columbus Web site
 Ginther's campaign website

1975 births
21st-century American politicians
Columbus City Council members
Earlham College alumni
Living people
Mayors of Columbus, Ohio
Ohio Democrats
Politicians from Columbus, Ohio
School board members in Ohio